The 1935 Palestine Cup (HaGavia HaEretz-Israeli) was the seventh season of Israeli Football Association's nationwide football cup competition.

The defending holders were Hapoel Tel Aviv. However, Hapoel Tel Aviv chose not to participate in this edition and defend the title. With six teams participating in the competition, the draw for the quarter-finals and semi-finals was held on 21 May 1935, with the two quarter-final matches being played on 1 June 1935.

Surprise contestants Maccabi Avshalom Petah Tikva and Hakoah Tel Aviv met at the final in the Maccabiah Stadium, with Petah Tikva winning by the odd goal.

Results

Quarter-finals

Maccabi Hashmonai and Hapoel Haifa received a bye to the semi-finals.

Semi-finals

Final

Notes

References
100 Years of Football 1906-2006, Elisha Shohat (Israel), 2006

External links
 Israel Football Association website 

Israel State Cup
Cup
Israel State Cup seasons